Martwick is an unincorporated community in Muhlenberg County, in the U.S. state of Kentucky.

History
A post office called Martwick was in operation from 1912 until 1962. The community's name is an amalgamation of Martin and Wickliffe, the names of two local families.

References

Unincorporated communities in Muhlenberg County, Kentucky
Unincorporated communities in Kentucky